Bear Creek Township is an inactive township in Montgomery County, in the U.S. state of Missouri.

Bear Creek Township was established in 1818, taking its name from Bear Creek.

References

Townships in Missouri
Townships in Montgomery County, Missouri